Jack Shelton may refer to:
 John Shelton (1884–1918), English soccer footballer with Wolverhampton Wanderers and Port Vale, killed in action in France. 
 John Frederick Shelton (1903–1983), Australian Rules footballer with St Kilda and Victoria.
 John Thomas Shelton (1905—1941), Australian Rules footballer with St Kilda and South Melbourne, killed in action at Tobruk.
 Herbert John Shelton (1924–2006), Australian cricketer with Tasmania.